Richard Franklin Herrscher (born November 3, 1936) is an American former professional baseball infielder who appeared in 35 Major League Baseball games for the 1962 New York Mets.

Herrscher attended Cleveland High School in St. Louis and Southern Methodist University. He was signed by the Milwaukee Braves as an amateur free agent in 1958. After four seasons in the minor leagues, he was traded to the New York Mets in May 1962 as the player to be named later to complete an offseason deal that had delivered veteran National League slugger Frank Thomas to New York.

Recalled by the Mets after spending four months of the 1962 campaign at Triple-A, Herrscher made his MLB debut on August 1, 1962, against the Philadelphia Phillies as a pinch hitter for Choo-Choo Coleman. Facing southpaw Dennis Bennett, he reached based on an error by second baseman Tony Taylor. Four days later, he hit his only major-league home run, a three-run smash against Jim O'Toole of the Cincinnati Reds that was a key blow in a 5–2 triumph, one of the Mets' 40 victories during their historically futile maiden MLB season. His final major league appearance came on September 26, 1962, when he collected two hits, including a double, in three at bats against Denny Lemaster of the Braves, his original team.

In all, Herrscher batted .220 with six runs batted in in 50 MLB at bats; his 11 hits included three doubles and his August 5 home run. In the field, he started six games at first base, three at second base and one at shortstop. He made two errors in 104 total chances for a fielding percentage of .981.  He returned to the minors in 1963 and 1964 before leaving baseball.

Herrscher also played professional basketball for the Long Beach Chiefs/Hawaii Chiefs in 1961–1963.

References

External links

1936 births
Living people
Austin Senators players
Baseball players from St. Louis
Basketball players from St. Louis
Buffalo Bisons (minor league) players
Hawaii Chiefs (basketball) players
Louisville Colonels (minor league) players
Major League Baseball infielders
New York Mets players
SMU Mustangs baseball players
SMU Mustangs men's basketball players
Syracuse Chiefs players
Vancouver Mounties players
Williamsport Mets players